The 1875 Kentucky Derby was the first running of the Kentucky Derby. The race took place on May 17, 1875.  The first Kentucky Derby was a 1.5-mile race, and the traditional distance of 1.25 miles was not established until the 1896 Derby.  Thirteen of the fifteen jockeys in the race, including winner Oliver Lewis, were African-American.  Attendance was estimated at 10,000.

The winner was Aristides, by two lengths. His jockey was Oliver Lewis, his trainer was Ansel Williamson, and his owner was H.P. McGrath. Aristides' half-brother and stablemate Chesapeake also ran in the race. Both Aristides' jockey and trainer were black. Aristides's time of 2 minutes and 37.75 seconds was at the time a world record for the distance.

The present day Kentucky Derby has seen a massive numbers increase since then. With the growth of the Kentucky Derby as of 2021, the derby, still held at Churchill Downs, can see in-person attendance as high as 65,000 with an average of around 50,000 spectators. These numbers do not include off-track spectators.

Full results

Payout
The winner received a purse of $2,850. The second-place finisher received $200.

The winner of the 2021 Derby received a $1,860,000 payout from the $3,000,000 purse. A massive increase from earlier derbies.

References

Citations

Bibliography

 Home: Library of Congress. The Library of Congress. (n.d.), from https://www.loc.gov/
 atNickVega.(2021, May 1). 2021 Kentucky Derby: How much prize money the winning jockey will earn. CNBC, from https://www.cnbc.com/2021/05/01/2021-kentucky-derby-how-much-prize-money-the-winning-jockey-will-earn.html
 Coleman, M. (2021, May 1). Medina spirit, Bob Baffert win 2021 Kentucky Derby. Sports Illustrated, from https://www.si.com/horse-racing/2021/05/01/medina-spirit-bob-baffert-2021-kentucky-derby-winner

1875
Kentucky Derby
Derby
May 1875 sports events